Eutolmus rufibarbis  is a Palearctic species of robber fly in the family Asilidae.

References

External links
Images representing Eutolmus rufibarbis

Diptera of Asia
Asilidae
Insects described in 1820